Burbong is a former railway station which was located on the Bombala railway line, that leaves the main Sydney-Melbourne line at Joppa Junction. It served the Burbong and the surrounding area, which is part of the locality of Carwoola to the east of Queanbeyan in the Monaro Region of New South Wales, Australia.

History
The station opened as "Molonglo" on 8 September 1887, being just west of the crossing of the Molonglo River. It was renamed "Burbong" on 1 January 1890. The station was closed on 20 January 1975.

The station building is on the northern side of the railway line, close to the Australian Capital Territory. It is in New South Wales, because the Territory-State border runs along the northern edge of the railway land at this point, not along the railway as is sometimes assumed. The boundary was drawn to ensure that all of the Bombala railway remained part of New South Wales.

On 21 March 1979, a woman was killed and her son injured in an accident at the level crossing with the former course of the Kings Highway at Burbong.

Aboriginal name
The name "Burbong" is from the Australian aboriginal name, in the local language, for Goulburn.

Current use
The station building still exists, having been redeveloped as a private dwelling. The railway line is used daily for services between Canberra and Sydney. The highway now crosses the line over a bridge.

References

Railway stations in Australia opened in 1887
Railway stations closed in 1975
Disused regional railway stations in New South Wales
Bombala railway line